Jordan Stevens is an American college football coach and former player who is the head coach of the Maine Black Bears football team. Originally from Temple, Maine, Stevens attended Mount Blue High School before playing defensive end at Maine. After his playing career, he went into coaching. In December 2021, Stevens was named head coach of Maine after several seasons at Yale.

Head coaching record

References

Year of birth missing (living people)
Living people
Yale Bulldogs football coaches
Maine Black Bears football coaches
Maine Black Bears football players
People from Temple, Maine
Coaches of American football from Maine
Players of American football from Maine